Alkartu was a publication issued from Mexico City in 1942-1947. The periodical was published by the Communist Party of Euskadi. It was published in Spanish language. Luis Zapirain was the director of Alkartu. Secundino Ortega was the editor of Alkartu. The office of Alkartu was located at Morelos, 77-3. The party also published an edition of Alkartu in Toulouse, France.

References

1942 establishments in Mexico
1947 disestablishments in Mexico
Basque diaspora in North America
Basque nationalism
Communism in Mexico
Defunct newspapers published in Mexico
Newspapers published in Mexico City
Newspapers established in 1942
Publications disestablished in 1947
Spanish-language communist newspapers